Elfin Forest is an unincorporated residential community of San Diego County, in the foothills of the Santa Rosa Mountains. It borders the rural, unincorporated town of Harmony Grove to the northeast, San Marcos to the north and west, Olivenhain to the southwest, and Rancho Santa Fe to the south.

This rural community is located about 9 miles by road from the Pacific Ocean and contains large homes on rolling hills and many trails for hiking and horseback riding. Most of the properties, which are split between the Rancho Santa Fe school district and SDHS school district, have amenities for horses and/or grow trees like avocado, orange, lemon, and grapefruit. Elfin Forest is home to a large number of domestic horses and farm animals. 

Elfin Forest is said to be haunted.

Hiking
The 750-acre Elfin Forest Recreational Reserve is a family hike through an ecological preserve. The Way Up trail climbs up to 1200 ft elevation and has many tributary trails. The Escondido Creek marks the trailhead. The main trail is 1.6 miles long and meanders up a wall then leads up to numerous trails of varying difficulties. There is a well-marked botanical trail describing the various plant life in the area. The hike passes next to the Olivenhain Dam and can also extend about 9 miles one way over the mountain to Lake Hodges.

Plant community
Elfin Forest is one of the terms used by naturalists to describe the chaparral vegetation which formerly covered much of coastal Southern California. It is variously known as California coastal sage and chaparral ecoregion, bush-forest, elfin-wood, heath-scrub. The coastal scrub supports many plants and animals, including the endangered gnatcatcher. This coastal scrub is now endangered and the state government is studying ways to protect it. The Elfin Forest valley contains one of the largest areas of virgin coastal scrub in Southern California. An Elfin forest is also a type of Dwarf forest in coastal California and elsewhere.

References

External links
 Elfin Forest Community website
 Elfin Forest/Harmony Grove Fire Department

Unincorporated communities in San Diego County, California
Unincorporated communities in California